GITEX GLOBAL (abb. of Gulf Information Technology Exhibition) is a global tech show, organised by, and taking place at, the Dubai World Trade Centre in the United Arab Emirates. The 42nd edition in October 2022 hosted more than 5,000 companies and over 170,000 attendees from 176 countries, spanning two million sq. ft of exhibition space, matching the scale of 33 football fields. GITEX GLOBAL 2022 presented its most empowering curation with seven multi-tech themes experimenting in the metaverse, a decentralised future of the internet, and a sustainable global digital economy.

GITEX GLOBAL's growth is spurred by ebullient market demand across all industry sectors, with over 1,400 new exhibitors in 2022 among the global line-up of companies and start-ups showcasing applications in the metaverse, AI, Web 3.0, blockchain, 6G, cloud computing, fintech, mobility, and big data.

The show featured more than 250 government entities  leading strategic digital projects and public-private partnerships, and approximately 1,000 speakers across fourteen dedicated conference tracks delivering 500 hours of  content  from the world's most influential ecosystems advancing business, economy, society and culture.

History
The show was launched in 1981 as GITE and occupied Hall One of the Dubai World Trade Centre. With the launch of MacWorld at the 1988 show, GITEX (with the addition of 'X') expanded to two halls and, for several years, has reached full capacity at the DWTC venue.  The mega tech event's unprecedented expansion in 2022 fuelled the installation of three additional sold-out halls, bringing the total number of halls to 26.

Co-Located Events 
In 2022, GITEX GLOBAL hosted seven multi-tech sector events: Global DevSlam, X-VERSE, Ai Everything, Fintech Surge, Marketing Mania, Future Blockchain Summit, and North Star Dubai.

Global DevSlam 
Launched in 2022, Global DevSlam is a Middle East event that aims to create a thriving home in the UAE for international coders and developers.  According to organisers, the 2022 edition connected 10,000 coders with developers from tech companies, including Anaconda, AWS, Google, Instagram, Microsoft, Oracle, and Red Hat. Running for four days, it also includes Pycon MEA, featuring a line-up of Python masters.

X-VERSE 
Setting another first in 2022, X-VERSE is an immersive metaverse journey, showcasing Web 3.0 brands and showcasing disruptive industry applications of the metaverse. With real-world case-studies and virtual experiences across manufacturing, gaming, education, entertainment, healthcare, retail and the future of work, the event enabled global enterprises and potential users to connect and explore the possibilities of the crescent virtual environments.

Ai Everything 
Ai Everything is hosted by the United Arab Emirates' Minister of State for Artificial Intelligence, Digital Economy & Remote Work Application Office. Its largest edition in 2022 totaled over 10,000 attendees, 130 exhibitors, 200 speakers, and 200 government leaders. The conference programme delivered 129 hours of content covering the ground-breaking technologies impacting the industry worldwide, from cognitive, smart, and quantum cities to AI research, interconnectivity, scalability, and industrial scale issues.

Fintech Surge 
Fintech Surge is a four-day event for the Paytech, Insurtech, Regtech, Wealth and Asset Management, and Digital Banking industries. [9] It was born to become a hub for entrepreneurs, innovators, investors, and regulators, in the MENA (Middle East and North Africa) region. In 2022, more than 100 leading financial companies, such as Mastercard and Mashreq Bank, global regulators, financial institutions, and unicorns held ground-breaking talks and workshops. In addition, more than 1,000 start-up entrepreneurs bolstered their networking while connecting with tech buyers and investors.

Marketing Mania 
Marketing Mania is a marketing, communications, and creative technology trade show. The 2022 edition provided 120 hours of content delivered by over 80 industry experts, with young professionals also receiving mentorship from 40 Directors and CMOs from international brands, including Google, Pearson, Boots, and Camelot.

Future Blockchain Summit 
The Future Blockchain Summit is a prominent blockchain and cryptocurrency conference in the MENA region. The show will return to Dubai World Trade Centre (DWTC) from 10 to 12 May 2023 for its 6th edition, bringing together industry experts, top global companies, and international professionals to discuss opportunities in the blockchain space. The programme includes talks and workshops to explore critical topics in the space, such as the future of Virtual Assets (VAs) and Virtual Assets Services Providers (VASPs), Crypto Bear Market, Blockchain-based SSIDs, Decentralized Finance (DEFI) mass adoption, NFTs, regulations in the metaverse, amongst others.

Related Events

Expand North Star 
Expand North Star is a global start-up show, taking place from 10 to 12 May 2023 at the Dubai World Trade Centre. Hosted by the Dubai Chamber of Digital Economy and organised by Dubai World Trade Centre, the annual three-day event will feature more than 1,000 exhibitors from 60 countries. Conceptualised seven years ago as GITEX Future Stars with a modest 200 participating start-ups, the event was co-located with GITEX Global as North Star Dubai until 2022. As its structure, format and programme expanded, it became a standalone show focused on venture capitalists, unicorns, scale-ups, start-ups, and key stakeholders from the tech ecosystem.

GITEX AFRICA 
GITEX AFRICA is the first overseas venture for GITEX GLOBAL, taking its 42-year legacy to the world's rising tech continent. The inaugural landmark event will take place from 31 May-2 June 2023 in Marrakesh, Morocco.  It was launched in partnership with the Digital Development Agency (ADD), a public entity leading the Moroccan government's digital transformation agenda under the authority of the Moroccan Ministry of Digital Transition and Administration Reform. KAOUN International, the overseas events organising company of Dubai World Trade Centre (DWTC), will lead the partnership. For many years GITEX GLOBAL has enhanced the African agenda. For instance, its 42nd edition (2022) featured key African unicorns, such as Jumia, Flutterwave, and Chipper Cash, and ministerial delegations from Nigeria, Ethiopia, and Morocco.

GITEX IMPACT 
GITEX IMPACT is a multi-stakeholder technology show for ESG (Environmental, Social, and Corporate Governance). The event is co-located with Expand North Star from 10 to 12 May 2023 at the Dubai World Trade Centre. GITEX IMPACT will aggregate the international ecosystem of breakthrough green technologies, investments, finance, and sustainable business models guided by global ESG standards. Strategically curated between COP 27 in 2022 and COP 28 later in 2023, the annual three-day event will augment the important solutions and applications of ESG standards against the clamour of profitability challenges and complex policies.

References

External links
Dubai World Trade Centre
GITEX Global
GITEX AFRICA

Computer-related trade shows
Trade fairs in the United Arab Emirates
Events in Dubai
Technology events